Chickering Hall may refer to:

 Chickering Hall (Boston, 1883), a concert auditorium in Boston, Massachusetts
 Chickering Hall (Boston, 1901), an auditorium in Boston, Massachusetts